The Nayak is a historic Indian title conferred on Sardars, who were governors of feudal states in the Middle Ages. Today it is also a surname. Nayaks are mostly Hindu and few Sikhs, who follow Hinduism and Sikhism respectively.

As a title 
Today, the surname Nayak is used by various castes and ethnic groups across India. Mostly they belong from forward class and mainly follows Sikhism and Hinduism.

 Nayak, or Naik is a title used by Koli caste of Maharashtra. The Princely State of Jawhar was founded by a Koli Nayak Jayaba Mukne around 1300. The Maval region was known as  Koli country of fifty two valleys in Maratha Empire. Each valley was controlled by a Koli Nayak and the Sirnayak, or head chief, lived at Junnar, and presided over the gotarni, or caste council. the Fort of Sinhagad was built and ruled by Koli chief Nag Nayak who resisted the Mughal Sultan Muhammad bin Tughluq for eight months. the Kolis of Maharashtra revolted against Mughal ruler Aurangzeb under their Koli chief Khemirao Sirnaik and in 1769, Kolis revolted against Peshwa of Maratha Empire under their Koli Naik Javji Bamble and broken the peace of Konkan and in 1798, Kolis challenged the British government under their Koli Naik Ramji Naik Bhangria who was father of freedom fighter Raghoji Bhangare.

 In Punjab and Chandigarh, the surname Nayak is used by Sikh people who follow Sikhism and are known as kshathriya in their societies.
 In Odisha and West Bengal, The Nayak is used by Hindu people who follow Hinduism.
 Naik was another Name of Banjara Tribe of India. The Naik/Nayak surname is generally used by Banjaras/Lambani/Labana throughout India. Banjaras can also be described as Naik in Uttar Pradesh. Head of Banjara village/Tanda is called Naik. Some notable Banjaras with the Naik surname are Vasantrao Naik and Sudhakarrao Naik.

In Andhra Pradesh, Telangana and Tamil Nadu, other versions of the surnames exists such as Naidu. Used by people belonging to Kapu,Kamma, Telaga and Balija. In the north of Tamil Nadu, the title Naicker and Nayagar are used by the Tamil speaking Vanniyars while in the south of Tamil Nadu, the Telugu castes such as Balija, Kamma and the Gollas  use the Naicker title. Also in Andhra Pradesh and Telangana the Naik surname is adopted as a surname by several communities including Bedar.
 The Muslim Siddis of Karnataka, use the surname Nayaka which they received as a title from the kings of Bijapur.
In Karnataka it is used by some subcastes of the Vokkaliga, Namadhari Naik communities. It is also a common surname amidst a section of Makkalasantana following a sect of parivara Bunt (community) and the Nayak/Bedar community.
 In Maharashtra the surname  Nayak and Naik is used by Kshatriya Marathas, CKPs, Saraswat Brahmin and Deshastha Brahmin communities.
 In Tamil Nadu, members of the Vanniyar caste are found in the districts of Chennai, Thiruvallur, Kanchipuram, and Chengalpattu. They use the Naicker and Nayagar as a surname or title. Also in Tamil Nadu, members of the Jakkama clan use Nayakkar, Naicker and Nayagar as a surname or title.

See also

List of Nayakars

References

Indian surnames
Titles in India